Acalolepta ampliata is a species of beetle in the family Cerambycidae. It was described by Charles Joseph Gahan in 1888, originally under the genus Orsidis. It is known from the Solomon Islands, Bougainville, the Admiralty Islands, and Vanuatu.

References

Acalolepta
Beetles described in 1888